Leuven Bears, for sponsorship reasons also called Stella Artois Leuven Bears, is a Belgian professional basketball club from Leuven. The club competes in the BNXT League, the highest tier in Belgian basketball.

History
The team has played in the Belgian First Division since 1999 and has participated in the Belgian Cup since 1954, winning the tournament in 2005. The Belgian Cup victory earned the team a place in the 2005–06 FIBA EuroCup where it finished fourth in its opening-round group and was eliminated.

Since the 2021–22 season, Leuven plays in the BNXT League, in which the national leagues of Belgium and the Netherlands have been merged.

Honours and titles
Belgian Cup
Winners (1): 2004–05

Season by season

Players

Current roster

Notable players

List of head coaches

References

External links
Official site 
Eurobasket.com team page

Basketball teams established in 1999
Basketball teams in Belgium
Pro Basketball League
Sport in Leuven
1999 establishments in Belgium